Smooth Love is a budget compilation album by American R&B/soul singer Luther Vandross, released in 2000 (see 2000 in music).

Track listing
"Forever, for Always, for Love" – 6:19
"Give Me the Reason" – 4:44
"Once You Know How" – 4:35
"There's Nothing Better Than Love" – 4:42
"The Night I Fell in Love" – 6:06
"So Amazing" – 3:38
"If Only for One Night" – 4:19
"You Stopped Loving Me" – 5:13
"A House Is Not a Home" – 7:07
"Anyone Who Had a Heart" – 5:42

2000 compilation albums
Luther Vandross compilation albums